The Charles Wells House is a historic house in Reading, Massachusetts.  The two-story Queen Anne Victorian wood-frame house was built in 1894 by Charles Wells, a New Brunswick blacksmith who married a Reading woman.  The house is clad in clapboards and has a gable roof, and features a turret with an ornamented copper finial and a front porch supported by turned posts, with a turned balustrade between.  A small triangular dormer gives visual interest to the roof above the porch.  The house is locally distinctive as a surviving example of a modest Queen Anne house, complete with a period carriage house/barn.

The house was listed on the National Register of Historic Places in 1984.

See also
National Register of Historic Places listings in Reading, Massachusetts
National Register of Historic Places listings in Middlesex County, Massachusetts

References

Houses on the National Register of Historic Places in Reading, Massachusetts
Houses in Reading, Massachusetts
1894 establishments in Massachusetts
Houses completed in 1894
Queen Anne architecture in Massachusetts